Redbank Creek is a rural locality in the Somerset Region, Queensland, Australia.

Geography 
The terrain is fairly rugged.  Part of Redbank Creek belongs to the Lockyer Creek catchment the majority lies within the Brisbane River catchment with Kipper Creek and Redbank Creek being the main waterways.  The locality is crossed from east to west by the Esk–Hampton Road.

Elevated parts remain vegetated with lower areas, particularly near Esk, being cleared for agriculture.  In the southeast of Redbank Creek is Esk State Forest.  Adjacent to the state forest is Esk National Park, covering 377 hectares.  The national park was established in 2006 to preserve biodiversity and conservation values in the area.  The state forest is used to harvest pine species. In the northwestern parts of the locality is Deongwar State Forest.

History
At the  Redbank Creek and surrounds recorded a population of 307.

References

Suburbs of Somerset Region
Localities in Queensland